The TechArt GTsport is a high-performance sports car based on the Porsche Cayman S. TechArt produces the GTsport in limited quantities with added performance and aesthetic features including engine and suspension performance pieces, bodykit, and interior upgrades.

Design and Features

TechArt takes the Porsche Cayman S a step beyond the capabilities of the stock production model. An upgraded 3.8L flat-6 rated at 385 hp is the soul of the GTsport.  This modified sports coupe is capable of speeds up to 177.1 mph and a 0-60 time of 4.8 seconds. Upgrades to the engine include a sports camshaft, aluminum headers, modified intake manifold, high performance exhaust system and a remapped ECU. Aerodynamic upgrades include a revised front and rear fascia with larger air ducts with rear diffuser, carbon fiber air splitter and mirrors, restyled rocker panels, and fully adjustable rear wing. Suspension upgrades included TechArt VarioPlus coil-overs with adjustable ride height, light-weight 20" TechArt Forumula wheels at 8.5" wide up front and 11" at the rear.  The GTsport starts at $138,000 USD.

Specifications
Weight: 
Power:  @ 6600 rpm
Torque:  @ 4600 rpm
0-: 4.9 sec
Top Speed:

References

External links
TechArt official GTsport page

Sports cars
Rear-wheel-drive vehicles
TechArt vehicles
Cars powered by boxer engines